Robin Brock-Hollinshead (30 July 1928 – 26 July 2017) was a British alpine skier. He competed in the men's downhill at the 1956 Winter Olympics.

References

1928 births
2017 deaths
British male alpine skiers
Olympic alpine skiers of Great Britain
Alpine skiers at the 1956 Winter Olympics
Place of birth missing